Burke is an Anglo-Norman Irish surname. 

 House of Burgh, an Anglo-Norman noble family
 Burkes, an Australian political family
 Burke family (Castlebar), a 21st century Irish family known for high-profile legal cases and protests